Pin-Rigide Ecological Reserve is an ecological reserve in Quebec, Canada. It was established on December 7, 1977.

References

External links
 Official website from Government of Québec

Protected areas of Montérégie
Nature reserves in Quebec
Protected areas established in 1977
1977 establishments in Quebec
Le Haut-Saint-Laurent Regional County Municipality